This is a list of Houston Cougars football players in the NFL Draft.

Key

Selections

References

 

Houston

Houston Cougars in the NFL draft
Houston Cougars in the NFL Draft